Late Shri Pragada Kotaiah (26 July 1915 – 26 November 1995) was born to Late Shri Pragada Veerabhadrudu, Late Smt. Kotamma in Nidubrolu, Andhra Pradesh, India. He was an Indian Freedom Fighter, Parliamentarian. He was the leader of the Handloom movement in India.

Career 

Pragada Kotaiah completed his schooling at Ponnur. He completed his textile technology from Madras Textiles Institute.

Education 

Shri Kotaiah finished S.S.L.C. in the year 1931; he came out with first class in Supervisor's Course in Spinning, Handloom, Weaving, Dyeing and Printing in the Textile institute at Madras. 
Shri Kotaiah also completed certificate course in Chemistry as applied to Cotton Textile Industry City and Guilds of London Institute in first Class.

Service to Society

Legislator 

Shri Kotaiah was Member of the Legislative Assembly from 1952 to 1962 in the composite Madras State, Andhra State and in Andhra Pradesh. Again elected as member of Andhra Pradesh Assembly from 1967 to 1972, he served as member of the Andhra Pradesh Legislative Council from 1974 to 1980. He served on several legislative subcommittees and was Member on the A.P. State Drainage Board and District Irrigation Committee.

Indian National Congress 
Shri Kotaiah was member of the Andhra Pradesh Congress Committee from 1948 to 1974, member of its working committee from 1955 to 1956 and its general secretary from 1974 to 1978.

Handloom Weavers 

Shri Kotaiah was General Secretary of the State Hand-loom weavers congress, Madras and Andhra, since 1942. Also general Secretary of the All India Hand-Loom Weavers Congress, founded in Nagpur in the Year 1945 with the blessings of Mahatma Gandhi.

Handloom Industry Protection 

Shri Kotaiah led Satyagraha Movements first for 75 days in Madras and again for 20 days in Andhra area, courted arrests and sentenced by courts.

Land Distribution to Poor 

Shri Kotaiah founded the Romperu Development Committee; got distributed about 16,000 acres of land of Romperu drain to poor in 1954. That was the starting point and set up example for the distribution of Government lands in the state.

Irrigation 

Shri Kotaiah was responsible for provision of irrigation facilities in Romperu lands in Chirala and for starting of Thotavaripalem Lift Irrigation Schema and helped economic uplift of thousands of poor peasants in several villages on the eastern side of Kunderu drain in Chirala Taluq.

Development of Drainage Facilities 

He fought for provision of drainage facilities to the lands irrigated in Krishna Western Delta in 1964, when irrigated lands in Chirala and Bapatla areas were inundated in the Floods. With the result Mitra Committee was constituted. The report was kept in cold storage; Again unprecedented floods occurred in May 1969 in Chirala Area, washing away into the sea more than 2,000 people working in the fields. When Dr. K. L. Rao the then Union Irrigation Minister visited Chirala at that time, Shri Kotaiah pleaded for implementation of the recommendations of the Mitra Committee and also got announced on the spot, a loan of Rs. 30 million by the Centre to the State Government to take up the Drainage Facilities. The Andhra Pradesh State Drainage Cess Act was enacted; Andhra Pradesh State Drainage Board was formed; took up the schemes for improvement of Drainage Facilities in both Krishna and Godavari Deltas.

Other Activities 
 Member of the Governing Body of the then V.R.S. College, Chirala (presently V.R.S. & Y.R.N. College), assisted in securing over 60 acres land for it
 Member of the Senate of Andhra University from the local Boards constituency, Guntur for one term.
 Responsible for erection of a life size bronze statue of Andhra Ratna Late Shri Duggirala Gopalakrishnaiah at Chirala
 Responsible for starting a Junior college at Vetapalem under the management of Shri Bandla Venkateswara Rao.
 Founded the S.USI.T.I., at Vetapalem with financial assistance of the family members and relatives of Late Shri Ummiti Sivaiah.
 Founded Andhra Kesari Prakasam Junior College at Chirala, forming the Andhra Kesari Prakasam Educational Society with the assistance of friends.

Academic Institutions 

In the year 1992 Shri Pragada Kotaiah Memorial Indian Institute of Handloom Technology was established in memory of late Shri Pragada Kotaiah, (Rajyasabha Member) M.P., the renowned weavers leader of Andhra Pradesh.  This Institute is one of the 8 Institutes in India under the control of Development Commissioner for Handlooms, New Delhi Ministry of Textiles, Government of India.

Timeline of Events

References

External links 
 Pragada Kotaiah birth anniversary on July 27 – The Hindu
 Shri Pragada Kotaiah Memorial Indian Institute of Handloom Technology (SPKMIIHT),
 Crisis in Handloom Sector: The ways forward in Andhra Pradesh
 DEPARTMENT RELATED PARLIAMENTARY STANDING COMMITTEE ON COMMERCE (1995–96)
 Speech of Sri B. GOPALA REDDY, Chief Minister and Minister in charge of Finance, presenting the Budget for 1955–56 to the Andhra Legislative Assembly on the 8 July 1955. 

1915 births
1995 deaths
Members of the Andhra Pradesh Legislative Council
Indian independence activists from Andhra Pradesh
Indian National Congress politicians from Andhra Pradesh
Rajya Sabha members from Andhra Pradesh